The Proposition is a 2005 Australian Western film directed by John Hillcoat and written by screenwriter and musician Nick Cave. It stars Guy Pearce, Ray Winstone, Emily Watson, John Hurt, Danny Huston and David Wenham. The film's production completed in 2004 and was followed by a wide 2005 release in Australia and a 2006 theatrical run in the U.S. through First Look Pictures. The film was shot on location in Winton, Queensland.

Plot
In 1880s Australia,  Charlie Burns (Guy Pearce) and his gang engage in a gunfight with the police. All of the gang members except for Charlie and his younger brother Mikey are killed. Captain Morris Stanley (Ray Winstone) tells Charlie that he will have Mikey executed by Christmas, which is in 9 days. Stanley offers to free both Mikey (Richard Wilson) and Charlie if Charlie agrees to kill his older brother Arthur Burns (Danny Huston), a mercurial psychopath and infamous mass-murdering outlaw who is wanted for serial rapes and murder. Mikey remains in custody while Charlie sets out to kill their brother. During a raid, the police capture some Aboriginal people who, when questioned, claim that Arthur is actually a "dog man" and no one goes near his cave.

Riding in search of Arthur, Charlie comes to the charred remains of the Hopkins home, a family that was murdered and the wife raped by the Burns gang. Along the way, he encounters an inebriated old man named Jellon Lamb (John Hurt) in a cantina where the owner has been speared to death. Charlie realizes that Lamb is a bounty hunter in pursuit of the Burns brothers and knocks him out. Later on, Charlie awakes and is speared in the chest by a group of Aboriginal men standing over him. Just before passing out, he witnesses the man who speared him get his head blown off by an unseen assailant.

In town, Eden Fletcher (David Wenham), who hired Stanley to "clean up" the area, orders that Mikey be given one hundred lashes as punishment for the rape and murder of the Hopkins family. Stanley is aghast at this, not only because he believes Mikey is not responsible for his actions and the flogging will kill him, but also because it will break his deal with Charlie and bring the Burns gang's revenge upon him and his wife. Stanley sends Sergeant Lawrence away with tracker Jacko (David Gulpilil) and other men to "investigate" the reported slaying of Dan O'Riley (the dead man in the cantina) by a group of Aboriginal people.

Charlie wakes up in his brother Arthur's camp, located in caves among desolate mountains. Arthur's gang consists of Samuel Stoat (Tom Budge), a woman named Queenie (Leah Purcell) who tends to Charlie's wound, and an Aboriginal man called Two-Bob (Tom E. Lewis). Arthur apparently sits alone for long periods of time in a catatonic, alienated, psychopathic state; appearing psychologically dead or dormant. As he recovers from his wounds, Arthur slowly is activated and Charlie is given several opportunities to kill his brother, but does not. He lies and tells Arthur that Mikey is not with him because he has met a woman.

Captain Stanley attempts to defend Mikey at gunpoint from the bloodthirsty townspeople, but is overruled once Martha arrives, insisting on revenge for her dead friends. Mikey is flogged and fatally wounded. The townspeople grow tired and eventually disturbed at the excessive display, Martha faints, and Stanley flings the bloody whip at Fletcher, who fires him. Back at the abandoned cantina, Sergeant Lawrence and his men have found and massacred a group of Aboriginal people. Arthur and Two-Bob find Lawrence's group while they sleep. Arthur’s psychopathy is now fully triggered, revealing himself to be a cunning murderer, and he kills Jacko. Before Arthur kills Lawrence, he tells Arthur that Charlie has been sent to kill him. Arthur doesn’t care and proceeds to stomp Lawrence to death with his boot.

Jellon Lamb enters Arthur's camp and ties up Samuel and Charlie, both of whom are sleeping. Lamb is shot in the stomach by the returning Two-Bob. Arthur begins to sadistically torture Lamb to death with his knife slowly while Lamb is still alive; in disgust Charlie points his revolver at Arthur, but instead shoots Lamb in the head, putting him out of his misery. In a confession to Charlie, Arthur acknowledges his disturbed nature and addiction to murder as a sickness, sensing his brother’s disapproval and asking for mercy and sympathy. Charlie finally informs Arthur that Mikey is in custody and is set to hang. Charlie decides to break out Mikey; Arthur, Samuel and Charlie ride into town dressed in the clothes taken from the officers Arthur and Two-Bob had killed, while Two-Bob poses as an Aboriginal man they have captured. Once at the jail, the men free Mikey, and Charlie and Two-Bob ride off with him, but the badly injured Mikey dies in Charlie's arms. Arthur and Samuel remain to behead the two officers in the jail.

Stanley fears retribution and makes preparations, but he and Martha let their guard down to have a peaceful Christmas dinner. Once they begin, Arthur and Samuel shoot open the door and invade their home. Arthur pulls Stanley into another room and brutally beats him. Samuel drags Martha inside, and Arthur has Stanley watch as Samuel begins to rape Martha. Charlie walks in and informs Arthur of Mikey's death; Arthur ignores him and encourages Charlie to listen to Samuel's beautiful singing. Charlie shoots Samuel in the head, killing him, and then shoots Arthur once in the stomach and then again, fatally in the heart. Arthur staggers out of the house and Charlie follows to find him seated on the ground, dying. In a moment of forgiveness and gesture of brotherly love, Charlie sits next to Arthur to watch the sunset. Arthur asks Charlie what he will do next, and dies after his question is answered with stoic silence.

Cast

Guy Pearce as Charlie Burns
Ray Winstone as Captain Morris Stanley
Emily Watson as Martha Stanley
Danny Huston as Arthur Burns
David Wenham as Eden Fletcher
Richard Wilson as Mike Burns
John Hurt as Jellon Lamb
Tom E. Lewis as Two Bob
Leah Purcell as Queenie
Tom Budge as Samuel Stoat
Robert Morgan as Sergeant Lawrence
David Gulpilil as Jacko
Noah Taylor as Brian O'Leary
Oliver Ackland as Patrick Hopkins
Mick Roughan as Mad Jack Bradshaw
Shane Watt as John Gordon
Rodney Boschman as Tobey
Ralph Cotterill as Dr. Bantrey
Bryan Probets as Officer Dunn
Bogdan Koca as Paul Broussard

Soundtrack
The film's soundtrack, titled The Proposition, was released shortly after the film in October 2005. The music was composed and performed by Nick Cave and violinist Warren Ellis.

All tracks are directly reproduced from the musical interludes in the film, and feature little alteration from the film score. Many songs on the album are slow-tempo and ballad-like, and the violin work of Warren Ellis becomes the central voice of the album for much of the time. The album is instrumentally focused, and is a departure from Cave's band-oriented compositions. Cave's unusual vocal performances on the "Rider" trilogy of songs brings a particularly haunting and uneasy tone to the album.

Reception

Box office
The Proposition received a Limited release in North America opening in 3 theatres and grossed $32,681, with an average of $10,893 per theatre and ranking #46 at the box office. The widest release in the United States for the film was 200 theatres and it ended up earning $1,903,434. The film also grossed $3,145,259 internationally including $1,567,266 in Australia and $1,157,037 in the United Kingdom for a total of $5,048,693.

Critical response
The Proposition received highly positive reviews from professional film critics and has a "Certified Fresh" score of 85% on Rotten Tomatoes based on 129 reviews, with an average rating of 7.30/10. The critical consensus states: "Brutal, unflinching, and violent, but thought-provoking and with excellent performances, this Australian western is the one of the best examples of the genre to come along in recent times." The film also has a score of 73 out of 100 on Metacritic based on 31 critics indicating "Generally favorable reviews".

At the Movies critic Margaret Pomeranz called it an "extraordinary film [that] explores the elliptical nature of class, race, colonisation and family. … All the performances are strong but once again Guy Pearce brings a strange power to Charlie and Ray Winstone is truly fine as Stanley. And Danny Huston is oddly perfect as Arthur. It’s a strange, unsettling film, ultimately quite moving, it’s impossible not to respond to it strongly. It’s not an easy access film. It’s violent and the motivation of the characters is sometimes oblique."

Co-host David Stratton thought that The Proposition was "a fascinating depiction of the outback in this period, and I've never seen an Australian film which told what is basically a bushranging story in such an unusual way. So, it has a lot of originality there. And it has fine performances. I thought Danny Huston was extraordinary, actually. He's an actor I usually don't respond to, but I thought he was excellent in this role. So, there's a lot of intriguing elements to this film, but I did find the violence almost unwatchable."

Roger Ebert, giving it 4 out of a possible 4 stars, described the film as "a movie you cannot turn away from; it is so pitiless and uncompromising, so filled with pathos and disregarded innocence, that it is a record of those things we pray to be delivered from." AM New York, The Austin Chronicle and Entertainment Insider also gave the film 4/4 stars.

Ty Burr of The Boston Globe acclaimed the film as "a near-masterpiece of mood and menace, and one that deserves to be seen on the largest screen possible".

J.R. Jones of the Chicago Reader said: "This Aussie feature perfectly re-creates the charbroiled landscapes and cruel psychodrama of the old Sergio Leone westerns, with John Hurt particularly fine as a raging old mountain goat." Lisa Schwarzbaum of Entertainment Weekly opined the film as "a pitiless yet elegiac Australian Western as caked with beauty as it is with blood."

Joe Morgenstern of The Wall Street Journal labelled the film "a visionary tale of a fragile civilizing impulse crushed by family loyalty and a lust for revenge in the vast outback of the late 19th century."

Nick Rogers of Suite101.com remarked: "John Hillcoat's violence-probing Western feels as uncompromisingly bleak, royally widescreen and graphically violent as any Sam Peckinpah opus - a sunburned, grimy-nailed saga of point-blank executions and blood wrung from a cat o' nine tails."

Chris Barsanti of the Film Journal International called it "the finest, strangest and most uncompromising western to hit screens since Unforgiven."

Awards

Indigenous culture
Three acclaimed Indigenous Australian actors (David Gulpilil, Tom E. Lewis and Leah Purcell) have supporting roles in the film.

As noted in behind-the-scenes features included on The Proposition DVD, the film is regarded as uncommonly accurate in depicting indigenous Australian culture of the late 19th century, and when filming in the outback, the cast and crew took great pains to follow the advice of indigenous consultants. In an interview included on the DVD, Lewis even compares the depiction of indigenous cultures in The Proposition to the landmark film The Chant of Jimmie Blacksmith (1978), which Lewis starred in.

Home media
The DVD was released in the United States by First Look Pictures on 19 September 2006.

Tartan Video's Region 2 DVD release in the UK was a two-disc release and contains these additional features: audio commentary by Nick Cave and John Hillcoat on disc 1, exclusive interviews with Guy Pearce and Danny Huston (25 minutes), a "meet the cast and crew" feature (35 minutes), a "making of" feature (118 minutes) and a theatrical trailer on disc 2.

The film was released on Blu-ray on 19 August 2008.

See also
List of Australian films

References

External links

 
 
 
 
InFilm Australia review
The Proposition at the National Film and Sound Archive
Full Cast Credits at IMDb

2005 Western (genre) films
2005 films
Bushranger films
Films directed by John Hillcoat
Films scored by Nick Cave
Films scored by Warren Ellis (musician)
Films set in colonial Australia
Films set in the 1880s
Films shot in Queensland
Films with screenplays by Nick Cave
British drama films
2000s English-language films
2000s British films